Liberal League may refer to:

National Liberal League (United States), an American organization 1876-1885
Liberal League (Finland), a political party in Finland
Liberal League (Japan), a political party in Japan
Liberal League (Luxembourg), a political party in Luxembourg
Liberal League (United Kingdom), a grouping within the British Liberal Party
Liberal Alliance of Montenegro, also referred to as the Liberal League of Montenegro
Tasmanian Liberal League